Dominic Burgess (born 29 July 1982) is an English actor. He is known for his appearances in several television adverts and series such as Raising Hope, Doctor Who, It's Always Sunny in Philadelphia, and Feud: Bette and Joan.

Early life
Burgess was born in Stoke-on-Trent, Staffordshire. He attended Newcastle-under-Lyme School, performing in school productions of Death of a Salesman and Twelfth Night, among others. He gained a place at the Academy of Live and Recorded Arts (ALRA) and won a Dance and Drama Awards Scholarship on the three-year Acting course. He auditioned for his first professional role on graduation day in his last year at ALRA for the film Batman Begins.

Career
Burgess' first TV credit was on the BBC flagship series and worldwide hit, Doctor Who as a game show contestant, Agorax.

He became a regular fixture on the Disney hit series, A.N.T. Farm, and appeared as a recurring guest on The Magicians as the Ram God Ember, The Good Place as the accident prone-red boot wearing Henry, and on The Flash as meta-villain Kilgore. Burgess also appeared as Mr. Vup in Star Trek: Picard for the episode "Stardust City Rag." He said appearing on Star Trek was a "dream come true," as he is a Trekkie.

Burgess received media attention and acclaim for his portrayal of Victor Buono in the Ryan Murphy created Feud.  "Played with uncanny precision by Dominic Burgess, Baby Jane co-star Victor Buono lets Feud give a nod to the plight of closeted actors in Hollywood at that moment and also to smartly weave in Davis' treasured ties to the gay community." -

Filmography

Film

Television

Awards and nominations

References

External links

Biography at Official Dominic Burgess Website

1982 births
Living people
People educated at Newcastle-under-Lyme School
Alumni of the Academy of Live and Recorded Arts
English male film actors
English male television actors
21st-century English male actors
English gay actors
English LGBT actors
Actors from Staffordshire
People from Stoke-on-Trent
20th-century English LGBT people
21st-century English LGBT people